British Steel may refer to :

Companies
British Steel (1967–1999), formed in 1967 as British Steel Corporation (BSC) through the nationalisation of UK steel companies and privatised in 1988 as British Steel plc
British Steel (2016–present), formed 2016 from the sale of the long products division of Tata Steel Europe (former British Steel plc business) to Greybull Capital.

Other
British Steel (album), 1980 album by heavy metal band Judas Priest
British Steel (yacht), 59 ft ketch used for a circumnavigation of the globe by Chay Blyth in 1970-71

See also
Iron and Steel Corporation of Great Britain